Ioan Străjescu (1833–1873) was a Romanian politician.  He was one of the founding members of the Romanian Academy.

1833 births
1873 deaths
Ethnic Romanian politicians of the Bessarabia Governorate
Founding members of the Romanian Academy